Samuel Francis (Frank) Boys (20 December 1911 – 16 October 1972) was a British theoretical chemist.

Education
Boys was born in Pudsey, Yorkshire, England. He was educated at the Grammar School in Pudsey and then at Imperial College London. He graduated in Chemistry in 1932. He was awarded a PhD in 1937 from Cambridge for research conducted at Trinity College, supervised first by Martin Lowry, and then, after Lowry's 1936 death, by John Lennard-Jones. His thesis was "The Quantum Theory of Optical Rotation".

Career

In 1938, Boys was appointed an Assistant Lecturer in Mathematical Physics at Queen's University Belfast. He spent the whole of the Second World War working on explosives research with the Ministry of Supply at the Royal Arsenal, Woolwich, with Lennard-Jones as his supervisor. After the war, Boys accepted an ICI Fellowship at Imperial College, London. In 1949, he was appointed to a Lectureship in theoretical chemistry at the University of Cambridge. He remained at Cambridge until his death. He was only elected to a Cambridge College Fellowship at University College, now Wolfson College, Cambridge, shortly before his death.

Boys is best known for the introduction of Gaussian orbitals into ab initio quantum chemistry. Almost all basis sets used in computational chemistry now employ these orbitals. Frank Boys was also one of the first scientists to use digital computers for calculations on polyatomic molecules.

An International Conference, entitled "Molecular Quantum Mechanics: Methods and Applications" was held in memory of S. Francis Boys and in honour of Isaiah Shavitt in September 1995 at St Catharine's College, Cambridge.

Awards and honours
Boys was a member of the International Academy of Quantum Molecular Science.  He was elected a Fellow of the Royal Society (FRS) in 1972, a few months before his death.

References

External links
 
 

1911 births
1972 deaths
People from Pudsey
Alumni of Imperial College London
Alumni of Trinity College, Cambridge
Fellows of University College, Cambridge
English chemists
Members of the International Academy of Quantum Molecular Science
Fellows of the Royal Society
Theoretical chemists
Computational chemists
Mathematical chemistry